Lieutenant-Colonel Henry Ernest Newcomen King-Tenison, 8th Earl of Kingston (31 July 1848 – 13 January 1896) was an Irish peer and Conservative politician.

Born as Henry Newcomen King, he was the younger son of Robert King, 2nd Viscount Lorton and 6th Earl of Kingston, and Anne Gore-Booth. Robert King publicly disowned the child, but his legitimacy was confirmed at the probate court in Dublin in 1870. Educated at Rugby School in Warwickshire, he succeeded to his older brother's titles in 1871. King-Tenison served in the 5th Battalion, Connaught Rangers, reaching the rank of lieutenant-colonel. From 1887 to 1896, he was Representative Peer for Ireland in the House of Lords and from 1888 to 1896 Lord Lieutenant of Roscommon. King-Tenison died, aged 47 in Cairo. 

On 23 January 1872, he married Florence Margaret, the daughter of Lieutenant-Colonel Edward King-Tenison in St James's in Westminster. After his marriage his name was changed to Henry Newcomen King-Tenison by Royal Licence on 10 March 1883. The couple lived at Kilronan Castle, which he considerably enlarged in the 1880s.

Philately
A philatelist, he exhibited his postage stamp collection of Great Britain at the London Philatelic Exhibition 1890 for which he was awarded a gold medal. From 1892 to 1896, he served as President of the Philatelic Society London.

References

 

1848 births
1896 deaths
88th Regiment of Foot (Connaught Rangers) officers
Irish representative peers
Henry
Lord-Lieutenants of Roscommon
People educated at Rugby School
Irish philatelists
Fathers of philately
Presidents of the Royal Philatelic Society London
Earls of Kingston